Ioannis Lambrou (alternate spelling: Giannis Lambrou) (23 March 1921 – 1998) was a Greek athlete. He competed in the men's high jump at the 1948 Summer Olympics. He also competed in the basketball competition at the 1952 Summer Olympics.

References

External links
 

1921 births
1998 deaths
Athletes (track and field) at the 1948 Summer Olympics
Basketball players at the 1952 Summer Olympics
Greek male high jumpers
Greek men's basketball players
Olympic athletes of Greece
Olympic basketball players of Greece
People from Karystos
Sportspeople from Central Greece
20th-century Greek people